Lindsay Boyd Collins (19 February 1944 – 2 September 2015) was an Australian marine geologist and sedimentologist,  a faculty member in the department of applied geology at Curtin University in Western Australia. He was interested in studying the continental shelf of Western Australia and coral reefs. Collins was a prominent scholar, he has completed projects on continental shelf mapping of Australian shelves, microbialites and seagrass banks at Shark Bay, and coral reef studies at the Abrolhos, Ningaloo, Scott Reef, the Rowley Shoals and the Kimberley.

Early life and education

Prof. Collins was born in 1944 in Western Australia. As a child, he had always loved the ocean because he grew up in his grandparents' place south of Perth and was fascinated by things happening in the ocean nearby. When he was young, he dreamed of being a marine scientist. He became interested in marine geology when he visited Shark Bay (800 km north of Perth), he loved its coral reefs and their beautiful environment and he wanted to learn more about its structure.

Prof. Collins obtained his BSc (Honours) in Geology in 1967 at the University of Western Australia. He completed his PhD at the University of Western Australia in 1983 on continental shelf sedimentation.

Career

Prof. Collins started at Curtin, then the WA Institute of Technology, in 1971 as a Lecturer in Geology. He gained his PhD in 1983 and became the Geology coordinator in the Department of Geology and Geophysics in 1984. In 1988 Prof. Collins was made a Senior Lecturer in Geology (Sedimentology), an Associate Professor in 1993 and in 2009 was made a Professor of Sedimentary and Marine Geology in the Department of Applied Geology. Lindsay was Head of Department from 1999-2005 and continued to teach the 2nd and 3rd year sedimentology course and lead the 3rd year field trip during his tenure as Head. During his time as head Lindsay was a key figure in the development of the department’s Double Degrees. Collins' research interests at Curtin included continental shelf sedimentology and substrate mapping, the coral reefs of the Western Australian continental margin, clastic and carbonate petroleum reservoirs, coastal mapping for management using GIS, sea level change, Tertiary limestone deposition and evolution, stromatolites, and warm and cool water carbonates. His most recent research focused on Shark Bay, with which he had a long association, and the little known coral reefs of the Kimberley.

He also worked in petroleum exploration as a specialist sedimentologist, and as a researcher in continental shelf, coral reef and coastal geology, specialising in carbonate sedimentation. He has been Chief Scientist aboard RV Franklin, a national research vessel, on several occasions. Prof. Collins had served as Assistant Director of CRC LEME, and Head of Applied Geology for six years. Up until his death he was a member of the Australia-New Zealand Science Council for the Integrated Ocean Drilling Program (IODP) and a Project Leader for the WA Marine Science Institution (WAMSI) Kimberley Research Program. A long association with Shark Bay led to the Curtin Shark Bay Project and the Caring for Our Country Shark Bay Project.

Prof. Collins' research interests include continental shelf sedimentology and substrate mapping, coral reefs of the Western Australian continental margin, clastic and carbonate petroleum reservoirs, coastal mapping for management using remote sensing and GIS, sea levels, Tertiary limestone deposition and evolution, stromatolites, and warm and cool water carbonates. Recent projects have investigated coastal vulnerability at Geraldton Port and in the Mid-West region, the evolution of Stromatolites and Thrombolites in coastal embayments and lakes, growth history of coral reef systems of Australia’s western margin, controlling influences on the variability of reefal and carbonate system and continental shelf, slope and coastal processes and sediments. Recent research sponsors include the Western Australian Marine Science Institute (WAMSI), Woodside Energy Ltd, Department of Transport (Marine), and Petrobras.

He had a long history at Curtin University, and was involved in teaching, research, and several years as Head of Department. In the over 40 years with the university, he has taught thousands of undergraduate students, supervised more than 40 honours and postgrad students, produced over 90 peer reviewed papers and reports, and led or co-investigator on at least 20 grants and consultancies worth almost AUD $11 million.

Death
Prof. Collins died on 2 September 2015 at the age of 71 and was buried in Karrakatta Cemetery in Perth.

Publications

For further information on publications, citations and impact scores please see the links below:

ORCID

ResearcherID

Google Scholar

Scopus Author Identifier

Research Gate

References

1944 births
2015 deaths
Australian geologists
Burials at Karrakatta Cemetery